Naivas Supermarket, often referred to simply as "Naivas", is the largest supermarket chain in Kenya, with 84 outlets as of June 2022. A that time, Naivas was the largest supermarket chain in Kenya, ahead of Quick Mart Limited with 51 outlets in the country.

Location
The company headquarters, as well as the company's warehouses, are located in Sameer Business Park, in the Industrial Area of Nairobi, the capital and largest city of Kenya. The coordinates of the headquarters of Naivas Limited are: 01°19'36.0"S, 36°52'04.0"E (Latitude:-1.326667; Longitude:36.867779).

Overview
Naivas is headquartered in Nairobi, with retail outlets in many urban centres in the country. In July 2018, the company hired Andreas von Paleske, as an advisor to assist the business with its strategy and operations. This culminated in bringing African private equity firm Amethis on board for a minority stake. At that time, Naivas Limited maintained 47 stores in Kenya. The supermarket chain opened its 53rd store in Kenya in July 2019 at Rongai, Nakuru County, with plans to open two more, the same year.

History
Naivas Limited was registered on 24 July 1990. It previously traded as Rongai Self Service Stores Limited, serving mainly in Rongai in Nakuru County. The company name was changed later to Naivasha Self Service Stores Limited, before re-branding to the current Naivas Limited, in 2007.

In August 2013, the Johannesburg Stock Exchange-listed Massmart, a subsidiary of retail giant Walmart, offered to acquire a 51 per cent stake in Naivas at a cost of KSh3 billion, giving Massmart a controlling interest in the retail chain. The bid triggered a feud at family-owned Naivas, and some family members asked a court to block the sale. In October 2013, Naivas management stated that they were no longer selling a controlling stake to Massmart. On 16 July 2014, Naivas opened a store in Garissa, making it the first major retailer to open an outlet in the town. This was Naivas' 31st branch in Kenya.

Ownership
Naivas Limited is a privately owned company, whose shares are majorly held by the descendants of its founder Peter Mukuha Kago, who died on 6 May 2010.

November 2014
The table below depicts the shareholding as of November 2014:

April 2020
In February 2020, the Competition Authority of Kenya (CAK) approved the acquisition of 30 percent of Naivas shareholding by the French equity firm Amethis Finance at an undisclosed sum. In April 2020, Business Daily Africa reported that the International Finance Corporation had acquired a minority stake in the company for US$15 million (KSh1.5 billion). As of that date the new shareholding in Naivas Limited, is as illustrated in the table below:

June 2022
In June 2022, a consortium led by Mauritian investment conglomerate IBL Group, bought out the IFC-led consortium at an undisclosed price. When that deal closes, the shareholding in Naivas Limited will look as depicted in the table below.

Branches
, the supermarket chain maintained forty-three branches across Kenya with the Nairobi south c branch being the latest. By February 2018, that number had risen to 45, with the latest addition being the Capital Centre Mall Branch, along Mombasa Road in Nairobi. In February 2020, the supermarket chain is expected to open its 64th store as the anchor tenant in the mega city mall, in Kisumu. By June 2022, the retail chain had grown to 84 outlets in Kenya.

See also

References

External links

Naivas Siblings Get Court Orders To Sell Big Brother’s Shop
 Naivas Founder’s Son Looks To Grow His Own Retail Chain
Updated List of branches

Supermarkets of Kenya
Retail companies established in 1990
Kenyan companies established in 1990
Companies based in Nairobi